FWF may refer to:

Austrian Science Fund
Fair Wear Foundation, a European trade organization
Five Way Friday, an American band
Frank Waters Foundation, an American arts organization